The Best of the Spinners is a 1973 greatest hits album from Philly soul vocal group The Spinners, released on Motown.

Recording and release
This is the first Spinners compilation and represents the string of recordings that the group made for Motown from 1964 to 1970. The group had persistent difficulties recording with the label on a consistent schedule, spending over a year signed to Motown before their first recording session and only producing two studio albums in that time. The group's contract expired in 1972 and most of the band members decided to leave Motown, but vocalist G. C. Cameron had married Gwen Gordy and had a different contract than the rest of the performers, so he departed the Spinners and encouraged them to add Philippé Wynne; the renewed line-up recorded a string of successful albums produced by Thom Bell for Atlantic Records for the next six years.

Reception
A review for Billboard calls this collection "smoothly stimulating tunes" and recommended that retailers bought the record due to the band's shift to Atlantic and current hits upon release.

Track listing
"Together We Can Make Such Sweet Music" – 3:04
"It's a Shame" – 3:10
"I've Got to Find Myself a Brand New Baby" – 2:33
"I'll Always Love You" – 2:43
"We'll Have It Made" – 3:26
"Bad, Bad Weather (Till You Come Home)" – 2:26
"My Whole World Ended (The Moment You Left Me)" – 3:35
"Truly Yours" – 3:00
"Sweet Thing" – 2:40
"O-o-h Child" – 3:13

Chart performance
The Best of the Spinners reached 37 on the R&B chart and peaked at 124 on the Billboard 200.

See also
List of 1973 albums

References

External links

1973 greatest hits albums
Albums produced by Johnny Bristol
Motown compilation albums
The Spinners (American group) compilation albums
Albums produced by Harvey Fuqua
Albums produced by Berry Gordy
Albums produced by Robert Gordy
Albums produced by Ivy Jo Hunter
Albums produced by Smokey Robinson
Albums produced by William "Mickey" Stevenson
Albums produced by Stevie Wonder